The 1938–39 Norgesserien was the 2nd season of top division football in Norway.

League tables

District I

District II, Group A

District II, Group B

District III

District IV, Group A

District IV, Group B

District V, Group A

District V, Group B

District VI

District VII

District VIII

Championship play-offs

Preliminary round

Quarter-finals

Semi-finals

Final

References
Norway – List of final tables (RSSSF)

Eliteserien seasons
Norway
1939 in Norwegian football
1938 in Norwegian football